The Ministry of Defence and Security of Botswana aims to provide safety, protection and promote human rights and rule of law via the implementation of pertinent policies and programming in order to achieve peace and tranquility. The ministry oversees the following departments:

 Botswana Defence Force
 Botswana Prison Service
 Attorney General's Chambers
 Botswana Police Service

List of ministers Ministry of Defence, Justice and Security (Botswana)

Ministry of Defence, Justice and Security 
 Dikgakgamatso Ndelu Seretse (2008–2010)
Lesego Motsumi* (2010–2011)
Dikgakgamatso Ndelu Seretse (2012–2014)
 Shaw Kgathi (2014–2019)
 Kagiso Mmusi (2019–2022)

*She is identified as the Acting Minister of Defence, Justice and Security in various sources.

Ministry of Defence and Security 

 Kagiso Mmusi (2022–)

See also 
 Politics of Botswana
 Government of Botswana
 Ministry of defence
 List of current defence ministers
 List of female defence ministers

References 

Botswana
Government ministries of Botswana